Lepasta majorina is a moth of the family Notodontidae. It is found in Colombia and Ecuador.

Taxonomy
Dognin described majorina as a subspecies of Lepasta bractea in 1914. It was raised to species status in 2011.

References

Moths described in 1914
Notodontidae of South America